Valentine FC is a semi-professional football club based in Valentine in the Hunter Region, New South Wales and is part of the Valentine Eleebana Football Club. Valentine have been promoted to the National Premier Leagues Northern NSW for 2016 with teams in First Grade, Under 23s, Under 19 and Under 17 divisions.

Notable former players include Adam Griffiths, Giancarlo Gallifuoco and Daniel Bowles.

References

External links 
 
 Northern NSW Football – 

Soccer clubs in Newcastle, New South Wales